The Moose Jaw Fire Department, founded in 1906, is a fifty-seven member fire brigade which provides fire suppression to Moose Jaw, Saskatchewan, Canada, and 15 Wing Moose Jaw, a military base just south of the city. They also have agreements with some rural communities around Moose Jaw.

The fire department has a guaranteed five-minute response time. In 2004 they had 658 emergency calls. Their motto is "Save Lives and Protect Property."

External links
Moose Jaw Fire Department

Fire departments in Saskatchewan
Moose Jaw